Monica "Nikki" van der Zyl (27 April 1935 – 6 March 2021) was a German actress based in the United Kingdom, known for her dubbing work on the James Bond film franchise.

Early life
Nikki van der Zyl was born on 27 April 1935 in Berlin, the daughter of Anneliese and Rabbi Dr. Werner van der Zyl.

Career
As a voice-over artist, she provided the voice of the character of Honey Ryder (Ursula Andress) as well as several other minor female characters, in Dr. No. Van der Zyl also provided dialogue coaching to Gert Fröbe, whose English was limited, for the movie Goldfinger and continued to work as a voice-over artist for the series until Moonraker. She worked as an artist, poet and public speaker.

In January 2013, van der Zyl published her book, For Your Ears Only, which was translated into German for a 2015 release in Germany. In November 2013, an exhibition called "Night Flight to Berlin" opened in the Museum Pankow in Berlin and ran until April 2014. The exhibition highlighted stages in van der Zyl's life from her childhood days to the Bond films and her work as a barrister and political correspondent in London.

On 20 September 2014, she was a special guest star at a 50th anniversary screening of Goldfinger in Braunschweig, Germany where she was awarded honorary membership of the James Bond Club Deutschland e.V. for her contribution to the James Bond film series.

Death
Van der Zyl died in London on 6 March 2021, at the age of 85.

Filmography

James Bond films
Dr. No (1962; dubbed Ursula Andress and all other female voices except Lois Maxwell, Zena Marshall, Yvonne Shima and Michel Mok)
From Russia with Love (1963; dubbed female hotel clerk in Istanbul)
Goldfinger (1964; dubbed Shirley Eaton and Nadja Regin, was also on-set English-language vocal coach to Gert Fröbe)
Thunderball (1965; dubbed Claudine Auger)
You Only Live Twice (1967; dubbed Mie Hama)
Diamonds Are Forever (1971; dubbed Denise Perrier)
Live and Let Die (1973; partially dubbed Jane Seymour)
The Man with the Golden Gun (1974; dubbed Francoise Therry)
Moonraker (1979; dubbed Corinne Cléry and Leila Shenna)

Other films

Man in the Moon (1960, revoiced Shirley Anne Field)
The Savage Innocents (1960, revoiced Yoko Tani)
La Fayette (1961, revoiced Claudia Cardinale)
Call Me Bwana (1963, revoiced Anita Ekberg)
You Must Be Joking! (1965, revoiced Gabriella Licudi)
The Ipcress File (1965, revoiced Sue Lloyd)
She (1965, revoiced Ursula Andress)
The Blue Max (1966; revoiced Ursula Andress)
Funeral in Berlin (1966, revoiced Eva Renzi)
Modesty Blaise (1966, revoiced Monica Vitti)
One Million Years B.C. (1966, revoiced Raquel Welch)
Prehistoric Women (1967, revoiced various characters)
Frankenstein Created Woman (1967, revoiced Susan Denberg)
Deadlier Than the Male (1967, revoiced Sylva Koscina)
The Jokers (1967, revoiced Gabriella Licudi)
Hannibal Brooks (1969; revoiced Karin Baal)
Krakatoa, East of Java (1969, revoiced Jacqui Chan)
Fräulein Doktor (1969, revoiced Suzy Kendall)
Scars of Dracula (1970; revoiced Jenny Hanley)
You Can't Win 'Em All (1970, revoiced Michèle Mercier)
Gawain and the Green Knight (1973, revoiced Ciaran Madden)
The Cherry Picker (1974; revoiced Lulu)

References

External links

1935 births
2021 deaths
Actresses from Berlin

20th-century German Jews

German people of Dutch descent
German voice actresses
German autobiographers
German expatriates in the United Kingdom
Nikki